This article lists the complete results of the knockout stage of the 2010 Uber Cup in Kuala Lumpur, Malaysia.

Bracket

Quarter finals

China vs India

Indonesia vs Malaysia

Russia vs Korea

Denmark vs Japan

Semi finals

China vs Indonesia

Korea vs Japan

Final

China vs Korea

References

Uber Cup knockout stage